Kamasa may refer to:
Kamasa language
Kamasa, Iran, a village in Hamadan Province, Iran